Byron Island may refer to:

Nikunau, Kiribati 
Byron Island (Buccaneer Archipelago), Western Australia 
 Byron Island, Chile (:es:Isla Byron) in Guayaneco Archipelago, Chile.